Nepeta discolor is a low-growing species of catnip that is commonly found in the alpine (Himalayas) and temperate regions of Xizang (Tibet) in China; Garhwal division, Himachal Pradesh, Jammu, Uttar Pradesh in India; Afghanistan; Pakistan; and Nepal. The species is named after the color of the leaves. It was described in 1833.

References

discolor
Cat attractants
Plants described in 1833
Flora of Asia